Serpulomyces is a genus of fungi in the family Amylocorticiaceae. The genus is monotypic, containing the single species Serpulomyces borealis, found in Europe. Serpulomyces was described by Ivan Zmitrovich in 2002.

References

External links
 

Amylocorticiales
Fungi of Europe
Monotypic Basidiomycota genera